Pardasena is a genus of small moths belonging to the family Nolidae described by Francis Walker in 1866.

Species
 Pardasena acronyctella (Walker, 1866)
 Pardasena atmocyma (D. S. Fletcher, 1961)
 Pardasena atripuncta (Hampson, 1912)
 Pardasena beauvallonensis (Legrand, 1965)
 Pardasena brunnescens (Hampson, 1905)
 Pardasena fletcheri (Berio, 1976/77)
 Pardasena lativia (Hampson, 1912)
 Pardasena melanosticta (Hampson, 1912)
 Pardasena minorella (Walker, 1866)
 Pardasena miochroa (Hampson, 1905)
 Pardasena nigriscripta (Hampson, 1905)
 Pardasena nolalana (Berio, 1956/57)
 Pardasena punctata (Hampson, 1902)
 Pardasena punctilinea (Hampson, 1918)
 Pardasena roeselioides (Walker, 1858)
 Pardasena verna (Hampson, 1902)
 Pardasena virgulana (Mabille, 1880)

References

External links
 Pardasena Animal Diversity Web
 EOL.org

Chloephorinae